Davor Matić (born 28 October 1959) is a Croatian association football manager and former player. He played as a central defender. He retired in 1990.

Managerial career
Matić was appointed manager of Dubrava, but resigned in October 2016 He later replaced Siniša Mioković as manager of Samobor and he managed Austrian third-tier outfit ATSV Stadl-Paura for a few games in 2021.

Notes

External links
hrsport website

1959 births
Living people
Sportspeople from Drniš
Association football defenders
Yugoslav footballers
GNK Dinamo Zagreb players
HNK Šibenik players
Yugoslav First League players
Croatian football managers
Croatian expatriate football managers
Expatriate football managers in Austria
Croatian expatriate sportspeople in Austria